"I'm the Only One" is a song by American singer-songwriter Melissa Etheridge from her fourth studio album, Yes I Am (1993). It was released as the first single in September 1993, reaching number 12 in Canada and number 26 in the Netherlands. In the United States, it was slow to gain momentum, but after the success of "Come to My Window", it was re-released, peaking at number eight on the Billboard Hot 100 and number one on the Billboard Adult Contemporary chart in January 1995. It remains Etheridge's biggest hit on either chart.

Content
Like many songs on her first album, Melissa Etheridge, "I'm the Only One" deals with non-monogamous relationships. In the verses, the singer tells how much she suffers because her partner desires someone else. In the chorus, the singer reminds her partner that even if her partner is in a new relationship, that the singer will always be the only one who really loves them with passion.

Music video
The music video for "I'm the Only One" was directed by David Hogan, marking their first collaboration on a video. Hogan, who became friends with Etheridge, later helmed several other of her videos, including "Your Little Secret" in 1995 and "I Want to Be in Love" in 2001.

It largely shows Etheridge performing at a club (including several close-up shots of her face) as well as same-sex couples making out to her sensual music.

Track listings
All songs were written by Melissa Etheridge.

US cassette single
 "I'm the Only One" (album version) – 4:54
 "Maggie May" (live) – 6:18

US maxi-CD single
 "I'm the Only One" (album version) – 4:54
 "Maggie May" (live) – 6:18
 "Ain't It Heavy" (live) – 4:13
 "I'm the Only One" (live) – 5:26

UK 7-inch single
A. "I'm the Only One" (edit) – 4:15
B. "I'm the Only One" (live) – 5:30

UK CD single
 "I'm the Only One" (edit) – 4:15
 "Bring Me Some Water" – 4:22
 "I'm the Only One" (live) – 5:30
 "Yes I Am" (live) – 5:02

Dutch CD single
 "I'm the Only One" (edit) – 4:15
 "I'm the Only One" (live) – 5:30
 "Yes I Am" (live) – 5:02

Credits and personnel
 Vocals and acoustic guitar by Melissa Etheridge
 Drums and percussion by Mauricio Fritz Lewak
 Electric guitar by Waddy Wachtel
 Keyboards by Scott Thurston
 Bass by Pino Palladino
 Engineering by Hugh Padgham
 Assistant engineering by Greg Goldman, John Aguto, and Mike Baumgartner
 Mixing by Hugh Padgham
 Mastering by Bob Ludwig at Gateway Mastering

Charts

Weekly charts

Year-end charts

Release history

Covers
The song has been covered many times on American Idol. In the Top 4 of season one, it was covered by Nikki McKibbin on 80's/90's week. In the Top 10 of season four, the song was covered by Nadia Turner on 90's week. In the Top 16 of season five, Kellie Pickler covered it, before advancing to the Top 12. In season ten, Lauren Alaina covered the song on Top 12 week, when the contestants were to choose one song from the year they were born. On the first season of The Voice, Beverly McClellan covered the song on the 7th episode, the first week of live rounds. In November 2011, Mark Salling covered the song in Glee's episode "I Kissed a Girl".

References

 Melissa Etheridge – Greatest Hits: The Road Less Traveled – Bonus DVD

External links
 musicmoz.org

1993 singles
1993 songs
Island Records singles
Melissa Etheridge songs
Music videos directed by David Hogan
Song recordings produced by Hugh Padgham
Songs written by Melissa Etheridge